Protein FAM156A is a protein that in humans is encoded by the FAM156A gene.

References

Further reading